The Anhanguera-Uniderp University is a private university in Campo Grande, Mato Grosso do Sul, Brazil established in 1974 and controlled by the private educational group Anhanguera.

References

Universities and colleges in Mato Grosso do Sul
Private universities and colleges in Brazil
For-profit universities and colleges